Sugar Boxx is a 2009 "women-in-prison" film directed by Cody Jarrett.

Plot 
A sexy news reporter goes undercover into a women’s prison to expose a sleazy, seductive warden who is a pimp in a secret prison prostitution ring.

Cast 

 Geneviere Anderson as Valerie March
 Thela Brown as Loretta Sims

Further reading

External links
 
 

2009 films
2000s crime films
2000s English-language films
American prison films
2000s American films